Laurens Historic District is a national historic district located at Laurens, Laurens County, South Carolina.  It encompasses 77 contributing buildings and 1 contributing structure in Laurens.   The district includes residential, commercial, religious, and governmental buildings built between 1880 and 1940.  Notable buildings include the Laurens County Courthouse, Old Methodist Church, St. Paul First Baptist Church, Public Square commercial buildings, Rosenblum's and Maxwell Bros. and Kinard Store, Provident Finance Co. and Parker Furniture, McDonald House, Augustus Huff House, Gov. William Dunlap Simpson House, and Hudgens-Harney House.

It was listed on the National Register of Historic Places (NRHP) in 1980 and extended in 1986.

It includes the Laurens County Courthouse, the James Dunklin House, William Dunlap Simpson House, and other properties that are separately NRHP-listed.

See also
National Register of Historic Places listings in Laurens County, South Carolina

References

Commercial buildings on the National Register of Historic Places in South Carolina
Historic districts on the National Register of Historic Places in South Carolina
Buildings and structures in Laurens County, South Carolina
National Register of Historic Places in Laurens County, South Carolina